Konawa Reservoir (also known as Konawa Lake or Lake Konawa) is a reservoir located in Seminole County, Oklahoma. It is owned by Oklahoma Gas and Electric (OG&E) Company. and was constructed in 1968-70, to provide cooling for a nearby gas-fired electric power generation plant.

Description
Konawa Reservoir supplies cooling water for a gas-fired electric power generation plant owned by Oklahoma Gas and Electric (OG&E) Company and located in Seminole County, Oklahoma. The plant has three steam-driven turbine generators and a gas turbine with a combined capacity of 1,534 megawatts (MWe). When the three main steam-driven generators are on-line, the plant must circulate a million gallons of water per minute (GPM) through its exhaust steam condensers.

The lake level is maintained by pumping water from the South Canadian River as needed.

Recreation
Rod and reel fishing is allowed at Konawa. State fishing laws apply and a valid fishing license is required. Water skiers and personal watercraft are also allowed to use the lake. Houseboats are prohibited.

Wildlife
In 2003, Konawa ranked first among Oklahoma Lakes larger than 1,000 acres in the production of Largemouth bass. Other species of fish include:Channel Catfish, Flathead Catfish, Hybrid Striped Bass,  Sunfish and White Bass.

References

External links
 Bowen, Danny. Konawa Lake 5-year Lake Management Plan. Oklahoma Department of Wildlife Conservation, Fisheries Division, Central Region. June 1, 2010 Retrieved May 25, 2015.

Reservoirs in Oklahoma
Protected areas of Seminole County, Oklahoma
Bodies of water of Seminole County, Oklahoma